Touching the Elephant was a BBC documentary about perception, first broadcast on 16 April 1997, in which four blind people encounter an elephant. Presenter Kim Normanton and the participants – Danni, a woman who loves animals; Graham, a computer buff; Tom, a piano tuner; and 10-year-old Lauren – discuss their idea of ‘elephant’ before meeting Dilberta the elephant at London Zoo. Excerpts of this documentary were aired on BBC Radio 4's "Beasts" episode of Short Cuts.

References

BBC Radio 4 programmes
British documentary radio programmes
Perception